The year 2022 is the eleventh year in the history of Glory, an international kickboxing promotion. 

Glory 80 and Glory 80 Studio were available exclusively through the Glory Fights Pay-per-view platform. Later events were broadcast on various streaming services and television channels around the world and also streamed on the Glory Fights Pay-per-view platform.

List of events

Glory 80

Glory 80 was a kickboxing event held by Glory on March 19, 2022 at the Trixxo Arena in Hasselt, Belgium.

Background
A Glory Light Heavyweight Championship bout between reigning champion Artem Vakhitov and title challenger Luis Tavares was booked as the event headliner. Tavares withdrew from the bout a week before it was supposed to take place and was replaced by Tarik Khbabez, who faced Vakhitov in a catchweight bout. The bout was cancelled on March 12, as Vakhitov himself withdrew.

A Glory Women's Super Bantamweight Championship between the champion Tiffany van Soest and title challenger Manazo Kobayashi was announced for the event. RISE Women's Flyweight champion Kobayashi joined as part of the organizations cross-promotion agreement.

Former K-1 and It's Showtime Heavyweight champion Badr Hari was booked to rematch Arkadiusz Wrzosek. The two previously met at Glory 78, with Wrzosek winning by knockout.

A heavyweight bout between Levi Rigters and two-time Glory heavyweight title challenger Jamal Ben Saddik was scheduled for the main card.

A lightweight bout between Guerric Billet and promotional newcomer Nordin Ben Moh was scheduled for the event.

The #1 ranked Glory middleweight Ertugrul Bayrak was booked to face the #4 ranked Serkan Ozcaglayan.

During Hari vs. Wrzosek Legia Warszawa Ultras started a riot and the rest of the event was cancelled over security concerns.

Results

Glory 80 Studio

Glory 80 Studio, also known as Glory 80+, was a kickboxing event held by Glory on May 14, 2022 at the Sportcentrum Valkenhuizen in Arnhem, Netherlands.

Background
Three fights were announced for the card on April 7, 2022: A Glory Lightweight Championship between the champion Tyjani Beztati and title challenger Josh Jauncey; a heavyweight bout between Antonio Plazibat and Tarik Khbabez; a heavyweight bout between OSS Fighters' Kevin Tariq Osaro and Rhys Brudenell.

Results

Glory Rivals 1

Glory Rivals 1 was a kickboxing event held by Glory in partnership with Enfusion on June 11, 2022 at the Zwembad Hoornse Vaart in Alkmaar, Netherlands.

Background

Results

Glory 81: Ben Saddik vs. Adegbuyi 2

Glory 81: Ben Saddik vs. Adegbuyi 2 was  a kickboxing event held by Glory on August 20, 2022 at the Castello in Düsseldorf, Germany.

Background
A heavyweight bout between former two-time Glory Heavyweight Championship challenger and three-time tournament winner Benjamin Adegbuyi and also former two-time Glory Heavyweight Championship challenger and 2018 Glory Heavyweight Grand Prix winner Jamal Ben Saddik served as the event headliner. The pairing previously met in 2018 prior at Glory 62: Rotterdam.

A Glory Light Heavyweight Championship bout for the vacant title between Luis Tavares and Sergej Maslobojev was originally booked for Glory 81. However, the bout was scrapped due to Tavares testing positive for an unspecified banned substance at Glory Rivals 1.

Results

Glory Rivals 2

Glory Rivals 2 is a scheduled kickboxing event held jointly by Glory and Enfusion on September 17, 2022 at the De Meent in Alkmaar, Netherlands.

Background
The event was headlined by a welterweight bout between promotional newcomers Endy Semeleer and Robin Ciric. Ciric withdrew from the fight in August 29, and was replaced by Shkodran Veseli.

Fight Card

Glory: Collision 4

Glory: Collision 4 was a kickboxing event held by Glory on October 8, 2022 at the GelreDome in Arnhem, Netherlands.

Background
The main event is scheduled to be a bout between Badr Hari and former K-1 champion Alistair Overeem in a trilogy bout.

Antonio Plazibat was expected to face the winner of Jamal Ben Saddik and Benjamin Adegbuyi for the interim Glory Heavyweight Championship. On September 1, Glory confirmed that the bout would not take place, as the fighters refused to face each other.

A Glory Women's Super Bantamweight Championship between the champion Tiffany van Soest and title challenger Sarah Moussaddak was booked for the event.

A Glory Light Heavyweight Championship bout for the vacant title between Sergej Maslobojev and former 2015 SUPERKOMBAT World Grand Prix Heavyweight Tournament Winner Tarik Khbabez took place at the event. Maslobojev was initially expected to face Luis Tavares, who withdrew from the fight on August 10.

Fight Card

Glory Rivals 3

Glory Rivals 3 was kickboxing event held by Glory in partnership with Enfusion on November 5, 2022, at the Sporthallen Zuid in Amsterdam, Netherlands.

Background
The event was headlined by a light heavyweight bout between Ibrahim El Bouni and Muhammed Balli.

A welterweight bout between Robin Ciric and Jay Overmeer was booked as the co-main event.

Results

Glory 82

Glory 82 was a kickboxing event held by Glory  on November 19, 2022, at the Maritim Hotel in Bonn, Germany.

Background
A heavyweight bout between former K-1 Heavyweight Champion Antonio Plazibat and former two-time K-1 World Grand Prix finalist and SUPERKOMBAT star Raul Cătinaș was booked as the main event. Cătinaș returned in 2021 after a 6-year hiatus.

The event was co-headlined by a vacant Glory Welterweight Championship bout between Alim Nabiev and Endy Semeleer, who were the second and third ranked divisional contenders respectively when the fight was announced.

Results

Glory Rivals 4

Glory Rivals 4 will be a kickboxing event held by Glory in partnership with RISE and Shoot boxing on December 25, 2022, at the Ryōgoku Kokugikan in Tokyo, Japan.

Background
The event was headlined by a featherweight bout between former RISE lightweight champion Kento Haraguchi and the former Glory featherweight champion Serhiy Adamchuk.

Fight Card

See also
 2022 in K-1
 2022 in ONE Championship
 2022 in Romanian kickboxing
 2022 in Wu Lin Feng

References

External links
Official website

Glory (kickboxing) events
2022 in kickboxing
2022 sport-related lists
2022 in Dutch sport